Return of the Cuckoo  (Traditional Chinese: 十月初五的月光, literally "The Moonlight at the 5th of October [Street]", also known as 澳門街, literally "The Streets of Macao") is a 20-episode TVB drama broadcast between July 2000 and August 2000. It was originally produced to be a sitcom, however later edits made the production into a regular drama.

Synopsis
As a child, Man Cho (Julian Cheung) was rendered mute as a result of the cruel actions of his mother and was adopted by the kind-hearted Ah Kiu (Nancy Sit). Man Cho grew up with Ah Kiu's daughter Kwan-Ho (Charmaine Sheh), and the two eventually develop romantic feelings for one another. Man Cho is extremely self-sacrificing, has an inferiority complex due to his disability, and therefore feels unworthy for Kwan-Ho. Ah Kiu is also against their relationship and things are further complicated when Szto Lai-Sun (Steven Ma) enters the picture after falling for Kwan-Ho too.

Cast
 Julian Cheung as Man Cho 文初 (age 23)
 Charmaine Sheh as Chuk Kwan-Ho 祝君好 (age 22)
 Nancy Sit as Chu Sa-Kiu or Kiu Yee
 Steven Ma as Szto Lai-Sun
 Michael Tong as Kam Sing 金勝 (age 25)
 Sherming Yiu as Kong Yi-Man
 Johnny Ngan as Chuen Hoi-King
 Irene Wong as Wong Hoi-Lam

Sequel & Remake
The movie version of Return of the Cuckoo was released in the fall of 2015. It is a continuation of the story where the drama left off.

A remake under the same title in Chinese, but titled A Love of No Words in English, was released in November 2021 on TVB starring Regina Ho and Hubert Wu. However, it immediately received criticism from audiences despite only several episodes having aired.

Awards and achievements
TVB Anniversary Awards (2000)
 "Favorite On-screen Partners" (Julian Cheung and Charmaine Sheh – Man Chor and Chuk Kwan-Ho)
 "Top 10 Favorite Television Characters" (Julian Cheung – Man Chor)
 "Top 10 Favorite Television Characters" (Charmaine Sheh – Chuk Kwan-Ho)
 "Top 10 Favorite Television Characters" (Nancy Sit – Chu Sa-Kiu)

References 

TVB dramas
2000 Hong Kong television series debuts
2000 Hong Kong television series endings
Television shows set in Macau